Pietro Ciafferi or Ciaffero, called Lo Smargiasso, was born at Pisa about 1600, and flourished, according to Lanzi, till at least the year 1654. He belongs to the Florentine school, and painted marine subjects and seaports, which his residence at Livorno enabled him to study from nature. His pictures are highly finished, and ornamented with small figures correctly drawn. He also painted architectural and perspective views, and sacred subjects. His works are principally at Pisa and Livorno. An 'Ecce Homo' by him is in the Pitti Palace, Florence.

References

Attribution:
 

Year of birth unknown
Year of death unknown
People from Pisa
17th-century Italian painters
Italian male painters
Painters from Tuscany
Italian marine artists
Italian battle painters